Trigonidium grande is a cricket in the subfamily Trigonidiinae ("winged bush crickets, trigs"), endemic to the island of Hawaii.

References

Trigonidiinae
Insects described in 1899